Roy Hill Station is a pastoral lease and cattle station, located about  south of the Roy Hill mine.

Roy Hill Station was an important cattle station in the north-west, being on the Meekatharra-Nullagine Road and stock route.

The station was established in 1886 by Nat Cooke, who owned Mallina Station. Mallina had suffered from several years drought so Cooke was keen to secure new pastures.

In 1915, the property was carrying 10,000 head of cattle. It is situated south of Mulga Downs Station, once owned by Lang Hancock and presently owned by his daughter Gina Rinehart.

A nearby  bridge crossing the Fortescue River to service the cattle industry was constructed in the late 1920s.

References

Shire of East Pilbara
Homesteads in Western Australia
Pastoral leases in Western Australia
Stations (Australian agriculture)